Benito Juárez is one of the 212 municipalities of the Mexican state of Veracruz. It is located in the state's Huasteca Baja region. The municipal seat is the village of Benito Juárez, Veracruz.

In the 2005 INEGI Census, the municipality reported a total population of 16,446 (down from  33,798 in 1995), of whom 1,069 lived in the municipal seat. 
Of the municipality's inhabitants, 11,757 (79.53%) spoke an indigenous language, primarily Nahuatl.

The municipality of Benito Juárez covers a total surface area of 217.15 km².

Settlements
Benito Juárez (2005 population: 1069)
Tenantitla (1232) 
Hueycuatitla (993)
Primo Verdad (San Miguel) (859) 
Tlatlapango Grande (757)

See also
Benito Juárez, 19th century statesman after whom these places are named.

References

External links 

  Municipal Official Site
  Municipal Official Information

Municipalities of Veracruz